Lotten Katrin Andersson (born 5 January 1950) is a Swedish former freestyle and butterfly swimmer. She competed at the 1964 Summer Olympics and the 1968 Summer Olympics.

References

External links
 

1950 births
Living people
Swedish female butterfly swimmers
Swedish female freestyle swimmers
Olympic swimmers of Sweden
Swimmers at the 1964 Summer Olympics
Swimmers at the 1968 Summer Olympics
People from Borås
Sportspeople from Västra Götaland County